Peter Nørby (born 1940), is a Danish chess player, Danish Chess Championship medalist (1968, 1970).

Biography
Peter Nørby was multiple participant in Danish Chess Championships. He achieved the best result in 1970, when he shared first place with Bjørn Brinck-Claussen, but lost an additional match. He was also the silver medalist of the Danish Chess Championship in 1968.

Peter Nørby played for Denmark in the Chess Olympiad:
 In 1968, at second reserve board in the 18th Chess Olympiad in Lugano (+0, =3, -4).

Peter Nørby played for Denmark in the European Team Chess Championship:
 In 1970, at second board in the 4th European Team Chess Championship in Kapfenberg (+0, =1, -5).

References

External links

Peter Nørby chess games at 365chess.com

1940 births
Living people
Danish chess players
Chess Olympiad competitors